Suffield is a hamlet in the parish of Suffield-cum-Everley in the Scarborough district of North Yorkshire, England. the hamlet is  north west of Scarborough ( west of Scalby) and just inside the North York Moors National Park. A local cider manufacturer works out of the hamlet.

References

External links

Hamlets in North Yorkshire
Borough of Scarborough